Vescia was an ancient city of the Ausones (a subgroup of the Aurunci), in what is now central-southern Italy, which was part of the so-called Auruncan Pentapolis and was destroyed by the Romans in 340 BC.

It was a fortified center, located perhaps  on the left shore of the Garigliano river, in the current comuni of Cellole and Sessa Aurunca, where remains of pre-Romans walls have been found. According to some sources, it was  located on the Monte Massico, where there also ancient remains including a subterranean aqueduct and large mosaic pavements.

Two Latin inscriptions referring to Vescia, dating to 211-212 AD, have been found  in Castelforte, Formia, in the southern province of Latina. These are now in the Archaeological Museum of Minturno.

References

Former populated places in Italy
Archaeological sites in Campania